Shell Oakville Refinery was an oil refinery located at Oakville, Ontario in Canada. It was located south of the Oakville Refinery, operated by Petro-Canada.

The refinery was decommissioned in 1983. The site has been cleaned up and redeveloped as a residential area, with parkland.

References

Oil refineries in Canada
Former buildings and structures in Canada
Buildings and structures in Oakville, Ontario
Shell plc buildings and structures